2 Fast 2 Furious is the soundtrack for John Singleton's 2003 action film 2 Fast 2 Furious. It was released on May 27, 2003 via Def Jam South. Production was handled by several record producers, including Keith McMasters, Cool & Dre, the Diaz Brothers, Elite, Just Blaze and The Trak Starz. It features contributions from the film stars Ludacris and MC Jin, as well as 2 Chainz, 8Ball, Chingy, Dead Prez, Dirtbag, Fat Joe, I-20, Joe Budden, Kardinal Offishall, K'Jon, Lil' Flip, Pitbull, R. Kelly, Shawnna, Trick Daddy and Tyrese Gibson.

The album reached number five on the Billboard 200, and peaked atop the Billboard Top Soundtracks and Top R&B/Hip-Hop Albums charts, spawning four singles: "Pump It Up", "Act a Fool", "Pick Up the Phone" and "Hell Yeah". As of August 14, 2003, It was certified Gold by the Recording Industry Association of America for selling of 500,000 copies in the United States.

Critical reception

AllMusic editor John Bush highlighted Budden's "Pump It Up", Trick's "Represent" and Ludacris' "Act a Fool" as standout tracks but found Tyrese's offering "weaker [even] than his solo work for J Records". Steve 'Flash' Juon of RapReviews.com gave praise to the overall Dirty South production throughout the first two-thirds of the album, highlighting Budden and Dead Prez's contributions for standing out amongst them, but was mixed on the final third having unknown artists on the last three tracks, concluding that: "Given that's a known fact about rap soundtracks, it's ironic that by using a somewhat less diverse mix 2 Fast 2 Furious actually achieves and in some ways ECLIPSES the success of its predecessor. Whether the movie can do the same without Vin Diesel is up to the audience of moviegoers, but hip-hop and Dirty South fans alike should be happy with the soundtrack".

Track listing

Notes
Tracks 1 and 17 are voice clips taken from the film performed by Ludacris.
Tracks 4, 7, 10, 12 and 14 are not featured in the film.

Bonus tracks
On June 23, 2003, an alternate version of the album was released with two additional bonus tracks, "Remember" and "Get Dirty". On October 21, 2003, a further version was released with a single bonus song, "Comin' Up" by Saukrates.

Charts

Weekly charts

Year-end charts

Certifications

References

External links

2003 soundtrack albums
Hip hop soundtracks
Fast & Furious albums
Action film soundtracks
Adventure film soundtracks
Albums produced by R. Kelly
Rhythm and blues soundtracks
Albums produced by Cool & Dre
Albums produced by Just Blaze
Def Jam Recordings soundtracks
Albums produced by Bangladesh (record producer)